Karachaus Lagoon is a salty lagoon in the Tuzly Lagoons group in Tatarbunary Raion of Odessa Oblast, Ukraine. It was a part of the Alibey Lagoon in past, locating in its south-west part, near the Village of Roylianka. Now it is separated from the Alibey Lagoon by the sandbar. The total area of the lagoon - 7.6 km2. 

The water body is included to the Tuzly Lagoons National Nature Park.

Sources
 Starushenko L.I., Bushuyev S.G. (2001) Prichernomorskiye limany Odeschiny i ih rybohoziaystvennoye znacheniye. Astroprint, Odessa, 151 pp. 

Tuzly Lagoons